Md Rawi bin Mahmud is a Malaysian politician and served as Deputy of Malacca State Executive Councillor.

Election results

Honours
  :
  Knight Commander of the Order of Malacca (DCSM) – Datuk Wira (2021)
  Companion Class I of the Order of Malacca (DMSM) – Datuk (2015)

References 

Malaysian people of Malay descent
Malaysian Muslims
United Malays National Organisation politicians
21st-century Malaysian politicians
Members of the Malacca State Legislative Assembly
 Malacca state executive councillors
People from Malacca
Living people
Year of birth missing (living people)